Sullia taluk is a taluk of the Dakshina Kannada district of the Indian state of Karnataka. The headquarters is the town of Sullia. In 2012, the government of Karnataka has planned to set up a rubber factory in Sullia taluk.

References

Taluks of Karnataka
Geography of Dakshina Kannada district